Doss or variation, may refer to:

Places
 Doss, Missouri, USA
 Doss, Gillespie County, Texas, USA; in Gillespie County
 Doss, Cass County, Texas, USA
 Doss Glacier, Queen Elizabeth Range, Antarctica
 Lagh Doss, San Bernardino, Val Mesolcina, Grisons, Switzerland; a lake

People
 Doss (surname)
 Desmond Doss World War 2 Medal of Honor recipient
 Doss Richerson (died 1979) U.S. athlete
 Mabel Doss Day Lea (1856-1906) U.S. politician
 Russ Rebholz (1908-2002; nicknamed "Doss") U.S. professional Canadian football player
 Doss (born 1990) American electronic musician

Education
 "doss subjects", United Kingdom slang for easy subjects
 Doss Consolidated Common School District, Texas, USA
 Doss Elementary School (Austin, Texas), USA
 Doss High School, Louisville, Kentucky, USA

Other uses
 A dosshouse is a British term for a flophouse
 Doss & Co., Golaghat, Assam, India; the oldest department store in Golaghat
 Danish Open Source Society
 Dioctyl sodium sulfosuccinate
 Doss porphyria, aminolevulinic acid dehydratase deficiency porphyria

See also

 Dos (disambiguation)